Pararhabdochaeta brachycera is a species of tephritid or fruit flies in the genus Pararhabdochaeta of the family Tephritidae.

Distribution
Philippines.

References

Tephritinae
Insects described in 1974
Diptera of Asia